The Bertol Hut is a mountain hut overlooking the Bertol Pass, south of Arolla in the Swiss canton of Valais. All accesses to the hut involve glacier crossing. On its east side it overlooks the large plateau of the Mont Miné Glacier.

The Bertol Hut is situated on the Haute Route from Chamonix to Zermatt. Nearby peaks include the Dent Blanche, Aiguille de la Tsa and Tête Blanche.

See also
List of buildings and structures above 3000 m in Switzerland

References
Swisstopo topographic maps

External links

Hut web site

Mountain huts in Switzerland
Mountain huts in the Alps